Sonnette is an unincorporated community in west central Powder River County, Montana, United States.  The community is situated near the headwaters of Pumpkin Creek, just west of the Custer National Forest.  It lies along local roads northwest of the town of Broadus, the county seat of Powder River County.

Climate
According to the Köppen Climate Classification system, Sonnette has a semi-arid climate, abbreviated "BSk" on climate maps.

References

Unincorporated communities in Powder River County, Montana
Unincorporated communities in Montana